Antônio Cleilson da Silva Feitosa (born 5 September 1987), commonly known as Amaral, is a Brazilian footballer who plays as a right back for Portuguesa.

Club career
Amaral is a talented side back who can attack from either side of the pitch. He is known for his ability to score in addition to his crossing skills. The young player was signed by Série A side SE Palmeiras after some stunning performances for Fortaleza EC. Amaral featured on a regular basis for Palmeiras' first-team squad.

After a decline in productivity, he fell out of favor with then-coach Caio Junior and was loaned out to SC Corinthians Paulista and Atlético Mineiro, until securing a loan deal with the Segunda División side Las Palmas.

Amaral owes his nickname to his physical likeness with the seasoned Brazilian midfielder Alexandre da Silva Mariano.

Amaral was capped at the U17 and U20 levels for Brazil.

Honours
Fortaleza
Campeonato Cearense: 2005

Ferroviário
Campeonato Brasileiro Série D: 2018

Brazil U20
South American Youth Football Championship: 2007

References

External links

1987 births
Living people
Brazilian footballers
Association football defenders
Campeonato Brasileiro Série A players
Campeonato Brasileiro Série B players
Campeonato Brasileiro Série D players
Fortaleza Esporte Clube players
Sociedade Esportiva Palmeiras players
Sport Club Corinthians Paulista players
Clube Atlético Mineiro players
Clube Atlético Bragantino players
Duque de Caxias Futebol Clube players
Associação Atlética Ponte Preta players
Associação Desportiva Cabofriense players
Ferroviário Atlético Clube (CE) players
Oeste Futebol Clube players
Associação Portuguesa de Desportos players
Segunda División players
UD Las Palmas players
Venezuelan Primera División players
Caracas FC players
Brazilian expatriate footballers
Brazilian expatriate sportspeople in Spain
Brazilian expatriate sportspeople in Venezuela
Expatriate footballers in Spain
Expatriate footballers in Venezuela
Brazil youth international footballers
Brazil under-20 international footballers
Sportspeople from Fortaleza